The M6 Bayonet is a bayonet used by the U.S. military for the M14 rifle, it can also be used with the Mk 14 Enhanced Battle Rifle as well M39 Enhanced Marksman Rifle. It was introduced in 1957, at the same time as the rifle itself. It is the only bayonet made for the M14.

Description
Like its predecessor, the M5 bayonet for the M1 Garand rifle, the M6 was intended to serve additional roles as a combat knife and utility knife.  The basic blade design was like the M4, M5, and later M7 bayonets, based on the World War II designed M3 Trench Knife. The overall length of the M6 is 11 3/8 inches, with a blade 6 5/8 inches long. Contractors who manufactured the M6 included Aerial Cutlery Co., Columbus Milpar and Mfg. Co. and Imperial Knife Co.The first of these  contracts was fulfilled in 1961, the last in 1969.

The M7 bayonet which succeeded the M6 bayonet was introduced in 1964 for the M16 Rifle. The most notable differences between the two are the diameter of the muzzle rings, the shape of the handle, and the locking mechanism. The M6 has a spring-loaded lever near the guard which when depressed releases the bayonet, and the M7's release mechanism is on the pommel. Both models are the same length, have the same black finish, and use the M8A1 sheath.

Today, the M6 is mainly used for ceremonial purposes, particularly by the Army and Marine Corps, both of which still use the M14 rifle for exhibition drill.

M8 and M8A1 Scabbard
There are two variations of this scabbard, both with an olive drab fiberglass body with steel throat. The early version M8 scabbard only a had a belt loop and lacked the double hook that earlier bayonet scabbards had for attaching to load carrying equipment such as the M1910 Haversack. The improved M8A1 scabbard manufactured later in WW II has the M1910 bent wire hook. The scabbard throat flange is stamped "US M8" or "US M8A1" on the flat steel part along with manufacturer initials. Some M8 scabbards were later modified by adding the M1910 hook. Later M8A1 scabbards were manufactured with a modified extended tab on the web hanger to provide more clearance for the M5 bayonet which rubbed against the wider bayonet handle. This sheath is correct for all post-war US bayonets including the M4, M5, M6, and M7. It was also used with the M3 fighting knife.

See also
M1 bayonet used by the M1 Garand
M3 fighting knife
M4 bayonet used by the M1 carbine
M5 bayonet used by the M1 Garand
M6 bayonet used by the M14 rifle
M7 bayonet used by the M16 rifle
M9 bayonet used by the M16 rifle
List of individual weapons of the U.S. Armed Forces

References

External links

M6 Bayonet

Bayonets of the United States
Military equipment introduced in the 1960s